Hagin ben Moses or Hagin filus Mossy (transliteration from Hebrew, Hayyim ben Moshe) was Presbyter Judaeorum or chief rabbi of the Jews of England and agent of Richard of Cornwall. He appears to have been the chirographer of the Jews of London, and obtained great wealth, but he lost it under Edward I. In 1255 he was appointed presbyter on the expulsion of Elias from that office. It seems probable that he was a brother of Elias (Tovey, "Anglia Judaica," p. 58). During the riots preceding the battle of Lewes in 1264 he fled to the Continent. His wife, Antera, and his son, Aaron, seem to have held possession of the only remaining synagogue in London at the time of the Edict of Expulsion in 1290.

References
Papers of the Anglo-Jewish Historical Exhibition, pp. 28, 178, 179, 193, 194.

13th-century English rabbis
Rabbis from London
English Orthodox Jews